Lapse or lapsed may refer to:

 Lapse and anti-lapse, in the law of wills
 Lapse rate, the rate that atmospheric pressure decreases with altitude
 Doctrine of lapse, an annexationist policy in British India
 The Lapse, an defunct American indie rock band
 Relapse, a medical term used in addiction treatment
 Lapsed (album), a 1997 album by Bardo Pond
 Lapsed power, a constitutionally granted power no longer in use
 Lapsed Catholic, a term for baptized Catholics who no longer practice

See also
 Relapse (disambiguation)
 Time lapse (disambiguation)
 Lapse of Time, a 1982 Chinese novella by Wang Anyi
 Lapsed listener problem, a problem in object-oriented programming
 "Mere lapsed", a 1998 Estonian Eurovision song
 Lapseki, a town in Turkey
 lapse function in ADM formalism of General Relativity